Apsinga is a village located in Tuljapur tahsil of Osmanabad District, Maharashtra. It's located 19.3 KM away from district headquarter Osmanabad.

Climate
The climate of this region is cool and pleasant as compare to other region of the district, due to luxuriant vegetation. Hence, this place is glowing the beauty of Balaghat ranges of Maharashtra (Gore-2012). The average temperature ranges from 27 to 38 degree Celsius and the average rainfall of Osmanabad district including this area is about 730 mm.

Geography
The hilly terrain is the main feature of this region, the entire area is covered by South east Balaghat ranges and large spur & valleys have pockets of high biological diversity. Thus, it is probably the richest region in biological diversity of rain shadow area of Maharashtra. The granite rocks have given rise to red as well as black cotton soil. Most of the hill tops are bare or covers coarse gravel while the low laying accumulates clay and loam during rainy season.

History
There is an ancient habitation site (Satavahana period) (180 03’ 38.16” N.; 760 02’ 36.43” E)  in midst of three villages; to south-eastern side at a distance of  2.3 km is Apsinga village, in the eastern side at a distance of 1.5 km is Kamta village and in the western side at a distance of  2 km is Katri village. This ancient habitation site is in the agricultural field belonging to a farmer of Apsinga village hence the name of the site is named Apsinga. The site is surrounded by two small seasonal rivers one at a distance of 300 m coming from the south direction is Nagzhari and the other flows at 5 m away, comes from eastern direction called as Kamta river.
The archaeological remains at Apsinga suggest it to be an important settlement of the Early and Late Satavahana period and medieval period. Ter and Paithan flourished during the Satavahana period as a major Indo-Roman trade center in the Deccan and played a major role in the Satavahana economic activities. In ancient times this area was a part of Dakshinapath. Archaeological sources suggest that when Ter was gaining importance during the Satavahana period, within 40 km radius smaller settlements started to develop gradually and contributed to the flourishing of the Indo-Roman trade.

Apsinga appears to be one of the smaller Satavahana settlements supporting bigger settlements like Ter.  According to the villagers ‘till recent times cotton was traded via Wadgaon (Siddheswar), an ancient Stupa site, situated 8 km northeast of Apsinga towards Ter’. Also, black soil in and around the site is most suitable for growing cotton. The evidence of conch shell debitage and a large amount of shell bangle pieces suggests that the raw material was being imported to the site for shell working. Including the brick structure of the area, the site seems to have covered an area of 3 hectares. The number of bricks coming from the site suggests that the site had a lot of structural activities.

The discovery of the ancient stone pathway of Limghat to cross the Balaghat ranges gives us some important clues for understanding possible southern trade routes. A good amount of Early historical and Late historical or Early medieval pottery was collected from the cultivated surface of the mound.

The village Apsinga has great historical background. In the past the Marathwada region was a part of Hyderabad state under the Nizam domain. Now Apsinga is completed in its four circles Kamtha, Katri, Dipak Nagar and Apsinga itself. In this areas the important things are great historical place Apsinga-wes (आपसिंगा वेस), Hutatma smarak, Shree Ram Mandir, Jahagirdar wada, Hutatma Shridhar Vartak samadhisthal and Awliya Dargah. The people celebrate various festivals like Dipawali, Dussehra, Ganeshotsav, Navratri etc.

Economy
The main crops in the region are Soyabean, Onion, Grape, Jawar & other vegetables.

Majority of the population is dependent on agriculture and wage labouring. Around 80% of the village population has farming as there major source of livelihood. The rest of the 20% of the population is engaged either in laboring or move to Osmanabad or Tuljapur for non-farm activities like dairy, honey collection, and almost all women of the village work in the fields.

Education
In Apsinga village educational institutions include: Narendra Arya Vidyalaya, Z.P. primary School, and one private institute, Rajeshwari Computers. During last fifty years Narendra Arya Vidyalaya has served students from poor and rural areas, and was established by Mr. Ramchandra Bhosale.

Rajeshwari Computers is established under the supervision of Mr. Dnyaneshwar M. Todkari, they offer various courses, including MS-CIT (an information technology literacy course), D.T.P. (Desktop publishing), and TALLY (accounting and inventory management software).
In Apsinga, there is a private coaching institute, Ajinkya Coaching Classes. The institute is run by Suryakant R. Mathe since 2001. Education facilities for 1st to 10th students are available here. Students learn English and Maths in this institute.

References

External links
 Apsinga at Wikimapia.org
  at Wikimapia.org
 
 Katri Katri at Wikimapia.org
 Kamta-Village Kamtha at Wikimapia.org

Villages in Osmanabad district